Lutfur Rahman Khan was a Member of the 3rd National Assembly of Pakistan as a representative of East Pakistan.

Career
Khan was a Member of the  3rd National Assembly of Pakistan representing Mymensingh-I. Khan was elected to parliament from East Pakistan as a Muslim candidate in the 2nd National Assembly of Pakistan. He had also served as a State Minister.

References

Pakistani MNAs 1962–1965
Living people
Year of birth missing (living people)
Pakistani MNAs 1955–1958